Gilles-François de Gottignies (10 March 1630 – 6 April 1689) was a Belgian Jesuit mathematician and astronomer.

Life 
De Gottignies was born in 1630 in Brussels, but became a very active member of the scientific community in Rome, where he became professor of mathematics at the Roman College. He opposed Jean-Dominique Cassini's theory and his works were translated in French by Georges-Louis Leclerc de Buffon. He died in Rome, aged 59, in 1689.

Works

References 

 Joseph McDonnell, Jesuit geometers, St Louis (USA), 1989
Biographie nationale de Belgique, tome 8, Bruxelles, 1884, coll. 154–156. (Notice par A. Siret)
Dictionnaire d'histoire et de géographie ecclésiastique, tome 21, Paris, 1986, coll. 921-924 (notice de R. Mols)
Diccionario histórico de la Companía de Jesús. Biográfico-temático, 2, Rome-Madrid, 2001, pp. 1789-1790. (notice de S. Bedini).
W. Audenaert, Prosopographia Iesuitica Belgica antiqua. A Biographical Dictionnary of the Jesuits in the Low Countries, I, Louvain-Heverlee, 2000, p. 392.
H. Bosmans, "La Logistique de Gilles-François de Gottignies de la Compagnie de Jésus", dans: Revue des questions scientifiques, 41e série, 13, 1928, 215–244.
L. de Wreede, Gilles-François de Gottignies (1630-1689), jezuïet en geleerde, thèse inédite, Leyde, 1999.
K. Porteman, Emblematic exhibition at the Brussels Jesuit College (1630-1685), Bruxelles-Turnhout, 1996, p. 109.

1630 births
1689 deaths
Astronomers of the Spanish Netherlands
Jesuits of the Spanish Netherlands
Jesuit scientists